is a Japanese footballer currently playing as a winger for Júbilo Iwata.

Career statistics

Club
.

Notes

References

External links

2002 births
Living people
Sportspeople from Tokyo Metropolis
Association football people from Tokyo Metropolis
Japanese footballers
Association football forwards
J2 League players
Tokyo Verdy players
Júbilo Iwata players